Wilson Powell may refer to:
 Wilson Marcy Powell, American physicist
 Wilson Marcy Powell Sr., Harvard lawyer